Nangalkot Municipality is located in Nangalkot Upazila, Comilla District, Bangladesh. The total population is 45469. Abdul Malek, of Awami League, is the mayor the municipality.

References

Unions of Nangalkot Upazila